Walluf is a river of Hesse, Germany. It flows into the Rhine in the village Walluf.

See also
List of rivers of Hesse

References

Rivers of Hesse
Rheingau-Taunus-Kreis
Rivers of the Taunus
Rivers of Germany
Rheingau